Me, Them and Lara is a 2010 Italian comedy film directed by Carlo Verdone.

Cast
Carlo Verdone as father Carlo Mascolo
Laura Chiatti as Lara Vasilescu
Anna Bonaiuto as Beatrice Mascolo
Marco Giallini as Luigi Mascolo
Sergio Fiorentini as Alberto Mascolo
Angela Finocchiaro as Doctor Elisa Draghi
Olga Balan as Olga Vasilescu
Tamara Di Giulio as Eva
Agnese Claisse as Aida 
Nimata Carla Akakpo as Hakira
Cristina Odasso as Mirella Agnello
Giorgia Cardaci as Francesca
Marco Guadagno as father Giulio
Roberto Sbaratto as father Savastano

References

External links

2010 films
Films directed by Carlo Verdone
2010s Italian-language films
2010 comedy films
Italian comedy films
2010s Italian films